Deepak Agnihotri was an Indian cricketer who played for Himachal Pradesh.

Agnihotri made a single first-class appearance for the side, during the 1992–93 season, against Haryana. From the tailend, he scored 1 not out in the first innings in which he batted, and a duck in the second.

Agnihotri bowled 25 overs in the match, taking three wickets.

External links
Deepak Agnihotri at Cricket Archive 

Indian cricketers
Himachal Pradesh cricketers
Living people
Year of birth missing (living people)